Novotolucheyevo is a rural locality (a selo) in Vorobyovskoye Rural Settlement, Vorobyovsky District, Voronezh Oblast, Russia. The population was 823 as of 2010. There are 7 streets.

Geography 
Novotolucheyevo is located 15 km south of Vorobyovka (the district's administrative centre) by road. Rudnya is the nearest rural locality.

References 

Rural localities in Vorobyovsky District